N.A.M. College, Kallikandy, is a NAAC accredited Arts and Science College located in Kallikkandy, Kannur district, Kerala. It was established in the year 1995. The college is affiliated with Kannur University. This college offers graduate and post graduate courses in arts, commerce and science.

Departments

Science
Mathematics
Chemistry
Computer Science

Arts and Commerce
Oriental Languages
English
History
Physical Education
Commerce
Business Administration

Accreditation
The college is  recognized by the University Grants Commission (UGC).

References

External links
http://www.namcollege.in

Universities and colleges in Kannur district
Educational institutions established in 1995
1995 establishments in Kerala
Arts and Science colleges in Kerala
Colleges affiliated to Kannur University